Sir Aubrey Thomas Brocklebank, 6th Baronet (born 29 January 1952) is a British entrepreneur and minor aristocrat. He is the sixth Baronet Brocklebank of Greenlands and Irton Hall.

He was educated at Eton College and University College Durham, graduating with a Bachelor of Science in Psychology. From 1981-1986 he worked for the merchant bank Guinness Mahon. Sir Aubrey is a trained accountant and sits on eight venture capital trust boards. He briefly came to public attention in 2012 when it emerged that one of his firms had bought all of London's fire engines for £2.

In his spare time he races classic Citroën 2CVs. He is a member of Brooks's.

References

Baronets in the Baronetage of the United Kingdom
People educated at Eton College
Alumni of University College, Durham
1952 births
British businesspeople
Living people